The Hazara University (HU) is a public university located in Mansehra, Khyber Pakhtunkhwa, Pakistan.

Recognized university
Hazara University is recognized as a higher education institution by the Higher Education Commission of Pakistan.

Overview
The campus is situated at the crossroads of the ancient civilization of Gandhara and Ashoka and facing the silk route on the outskirts of Mansehra which had been the ancient link between the sub-continent, China and Central Asia.

Faculties and departments

Faculty of Arts & Humanities
Department of Archaeology
Department of Architecture
Department of Art & Design
Department of Communication & Media Studies
Department of Conservation Studies
Department of Education
Department of English
Department of Geology
Department of Pakistan Studies
Department of Tourism & Hospitality
Department of Urdu

Faculty of Biological & Health Sciences
Department of Agriculture
Department of Biochemistry
Department of Biotechnology
Department of Biotechnology & Genetic Engineering
Department of Botany
Department of Human Genetics
Department of Microbiology
Department of Pharmacy
Department of Zoology

Faculty of Law & Social Sciences
Department of Economics
Department of Islamic & Religious Studies
Department of Law
Department of Management. Sciences
Department of Political Science
Department of International Relations
Department of Psychology
Department of Public Administration
Department of Sociology

Faculty of Natural & Computational Sciences
Department of Bioinformatics
Department of Chemistry
Department of Environmental Sciences
Department of Information Technology
Department of Mathematics
Department of Physics
Department of Telecommunication
Department of Statistics

This university offers Bachelor's degree in the fields of Arts & Humanities, Business & Social Sciences and Science & Technology.

References

External links

 Official website

Mansehra District
Public universities and colleges in Khyber Pakhtunkhwa
Educational institutions established in 2002
2002 establishments in Pakistan